Erminia Russo (born July 24, 1964 in Kelowna, British Columbia) is a retired female volleyball player from Canada.

Russo competed for her native country at the 1996 Summer Olympics in Atlanta. There, the resident of Kelowna, British Columbia finished in 10th place with the Women's National Team.

References
Canadian Olympic Committee

1964 births
Canadian women's volleyball players
Canadian people of Italian descent
Living people
Olympic volleyball players of Canada
Sportspeople from Kelowna
Volleyball players at the 1996 Summer Olympics